The Roman Catholic Diocese of Trujillo is a diocese located in the city of Trujillo in the Ecclesiastical province of Mérida in Venezuela.

History
On 4 June 1957 Pope Pius XII established the Diocese of Trujillo from the Metropolitan Archdiocese of Mérida.

The episcopal headquarters is in the city of Trujillo, where the Cathedral of Our Lady of Peace is located.

Its territory is divided into 79 parishes, a Rectory and a Vicariate.

Bishops

Ordinaries
Antonio Ignacio Camargo † (2 Sep 1957 – 13 Dec 1961)
José Léon Rojas Chaparro † (13 Dec 1961 – 11 Jun 1982)
Vicente Ramón Hernández Peña † (11 Jun 1982 – 3 Apr 2012)
Cástor Oswaldo Azuaje Pérez, O.C.D. † (3 Apr 2012 – 8 Jan 2021)
José Trinidad Fernández Angulo (15 Jul 2021 – present)

Coadjutors bishops
José Léon Rojas Chaparro † (1961)
Rosalio José Castillo Lara, S.D.B. † (1973-1975), did not succeed to see; appointed Secretary of the Pontifical Commission for the Revision of the Code of Canon Law
Vicente Ramón Hernández Peña † (1976-1982)

Other priests of this diocese who became bishops
Joaquín José Morón Hidalgo † , appointed Bishop of Valle de la Pascua in 1992
José de la Trinidad Valera Angulo, appointed Auxiliary Bishop of Caracas, Santiago de Venezuela in 1997
José Luis Azuaje Ayala, appointed Auxiliary Bishop of Barquisimeto in 1999
Ramón José Aponte Fernández, appointed Bishop of Valle de la Pascua in 2004
Benito Adán Méndez Bracamonte, appointed Bishop of Venezuela, Military in 2015
Carlos Alfredo Cabezas Mendoza, appointed Bishop of Punto Fijo in 2016

See also
Roman Catholicism in Venezuela

References

External links
 GCatholic.org
 Catholic Hierarchy 

Roman Catholic dioceses in Venezuela
Roman Catholic Ecclesiastical Province of Mérida in Venezuela
Christian organizations established in 1957
Roman Catholic dioceses and prelatures established in the 20th century
1957 establishments in Venezuela
Trujillo, Venezuela